Liestal railway station is a railway station in Switzerland, in the municipality of Liestal and canton of Basel-Landschaft. The station is on the Swiss Federal Railway's Hauenstein main line, which connects Basel and Olten. It is served by five trains per hour to Basel, four trains per hour to Olten, and hourly trains to Interlaken, Lucerne, and Zürich. Several trains a day operate through to Frankfurt and Berlin. The station is also the junction for, and terminus of, the Waldenburg narrow gauge railway, which operates a half-hourly train service to Waldenburg. The Waldenburg line closed in April 2021 for conversion to  gauge. Since 2019, the Swiss Federal Railways has been undertaking renovation and expansion works at Liestal which were commissioned by the federal government and which are due to be completed in 2025.

Services 
 the following services stop at Liestal:

 EuroCity / InterCity / Intercity Express (ICE): hourly service between Basel SBB and Interlaken Ost, with a single EuroCity continuing from Basel to Hamburg-Altona and two ICEs continuing to Berlin Ostbahnhof.
 InterRegio:
 hourly service between Basel SBB and Lucerne.
 hourly service between Basel SBB and Zürich Hauptbahnhof.
 Basel trinational S-Bahn: : half-hourly service between Laufen and Olten, with every other train continuing from Laufen to Porrentruy.

Service over Baselland Transport Waldenburg line is suspended through the end of 2022.

References

External links 
 
 

Liestal
Railway stations in Basel-Landschaft
Swiss Federal Railways stations